Two of Coins is a card used in Latin suited playing cards which include tarot decks. It is part of what tarot card readers call the "Minor Arcana"
Tarot cards are used throughout much of Europe to play tarot card games.

In English-speaking countries, where the games are largely unknown, Tarot cards came to be utilized primarily for divinatory purposes.

Symbolism
The Rider–Waite Two of Coins is inspired by the ribbon of traditional tarots which often displayed the name of the card manufacturer.

Common Interpretation
The Two of Coins, or The Two of Pentacles is a card when upright means to juggle, to struggle in a positive influence, to balance, to maintain. To keep your head up but feel like you want to jump out of your skin. It symbolizes an internal mental struggle, being unsure not knowing your path during ascension.
The Reversed card indicates imbalances, excess juggling, excess struggle, the advice of the card is to re-dress balance.

References

Suit of Coins